Statistics of the Scottish Football League in season 1985–86.

Scottish Premier Division

Celtic won the League and became champions in one of the closest finishes in League history. On the final day of the season Hearts were leading Celtic by two points - a draw against Dundee would have been sufficient to see them win their first League title since the 1959–60 season. Hearts lost 2–0 to Dundee at Dens Park thanks to two goals by substitute Albert Kidd; the first in the 83rd minute and the second in the final minute while Celtic beat St Mirren 5–0 at Love Street. As a result, Celtic won the league on goal difference.

Relegation was suspended due to league reconstruction, therefore Motherwell and Clydebank retained their Premier Division status.

Scottish First Division

Scottish Second Division

See also
1985–86 in Scottish football

References

 
Scottish Football League seasons